Knight relay chess (also called N-relay chess) is a chess variant invented by Mannis Charosh in 1972. In this game, knights "relay" their power to friendly pieces.

Rules
The rules are the same as those of orthodox chess except as follows.

Any piece, except for the king, that is defended by a friendly knight has the power, in addition to its normal abilities, to move like an orthodox knight. The piece loses the additional power as soon as it is no longer defended by a friendly knight. The knight itself is immune from capture, cannot capture enemy pieces and cannot give check. A pawn can be promoted to a new knight, which has the same properties. A pawn may not move to or attack its first or last rank using relayed knight power. If a pawn is relayed to its initial rank, it regains the option to make a double-step move. There is no en passant capture.

Example

The diagram shows possible moves of the white pawn on e6. Since it is defended by a friendly knight on d4, it can (in addition to its normal abilities) move like a knight to c7, c5, f4, g5 or g7. It cannot relay as a knight to the last rank; the black king on d8 is not in check from the pawn. The white knight on b7 does not check the king either and is not able to capture the pawn on a5. The white queen cannot take the black knight on c3.

White can deliver checkmate in this position by playing Qd6#. The black king cannot escape to c8 or e8, since the white queen attacks those squares via knight power relayed by the b7-knight.

See also
Annan shogi

References

Bibliography

External links 
 N-Relay Chess by Alessandro Castelli, The Chess Variant Pages
 Knight Relay a simple program by Ed Friedlander (Java)

Chess variants
1972 in chess
Board games introduced in 1972